Ella Vos (born Lauren Salamone) is an American pop singer-songwriter based in Los Angeles.

Career
A classically trained pianist, Vos worked as a keyboardist for BØRNS before deciding to pursue a career as a singer-songwriter after the birth of her son in 2015. She first gained attention as a vocalist on the 2016 EDM track "Rolling Dice" by Just a Gent.

Her first solo single, "White Noise", a song about being a new mother, was released in October 2016. Rolling Stone described it as "a seductive, gauzy, downtempo offering." The Boston Globe called her single "You Don't Know About Me" "one of the most highly charged sociopolitical songs of 2017." In 2018, she teamed with Icona Pop, VÉRITÉ, and Mija to remix "You Don't Know About Me" in support of the ACLU. Her debut album Words I Never Said was released on November 17, 2017.

In 2017 she toured the US, and performed at the Bonnaroo Music Festival. In February 2018 she embarked on the North American Words I Never Said Tour, with Freya Ridings.

In 2018 she was named a Vevo dscvr Artist to Watch. Her stage name means "she you" in Spanish.

Her five-song EP Watch & Wait was released on January 25, 2019.

Discography

Albums
 Words I Never Said (November 17, 2017)
 Turbulence (July 31, 2020)

Extended plays
 Watch & Wait (January 25, 2019)

Singles
 "White Noise" (2016)
 "You Don't Know About Me" (2017)
 "Thank God It's Christmas" (2017)
 "Cast Away" (2018)
 "Ocean" (2018)
 "Temporary" (2019)
 "Turbulence" (2020)
 "The Way I Am" (with Gavin Haley) (2020)

Appearances
 "Rolling Dice" – Just a Gent with Ella Vos and Joey Chavez (on the album Stories to Tell, 2016)
 "Exhale" – R3HAB with Ella Vos
 "Miles to Go" – Kaskade with Ella Vos

References

External links 

 Ella Vos performs at Paste Studios, NY, 3/8/18

American women singer-songwriters
American women pop singers
Singers from Los Angeles
Year of birth missing (living people)
Living people
Singer-songwriters from California
21st-century American women